The Forsaken Land (Sulanga Enu Pinisa) is a 2005 Sri Lankan drama film directed by Vimukthi Jayasundara and co-produced by Phillip Amril and Francisco Vilolobos. It stars Kaushalya Fernando and Mahendra Perera in lead roles along with Nilupuli Jayawardena and Hemasiri Liyanage. Music composed by Nadeeka Guruge. It was screened in the Un Certain Regard section at the 2005 Cannes Film Festival, where it won the Caméra d'Or. It is the 1,055th Sri Lankan film in the Sinhala cinema.

Cast
 Kaushalya Fernando as Soma
 Nilupili Jayawardena as Lata
 Hemasiri Liyanage as Piyasiri
 Saumya Liyanage as Palitha
 Pumudika Sapurni Peiris as Batti
 Mahendra Perera as Soldier Anura

Reception
The film received fairly positive reviews from critics. The film holds a 63% rating on Rotten Tomatoes, with an average rating of 5.8/10.

Recognition
The film was selected as the best Cine Mart project in The 2004 International Film Festival Rotterdam. The film won the award Prince Claus Film Grant at the same film festival.

The film made history when it was selected to honored at the International Cannes Film Festival. It is only the second time where a Sri Lankan film has entered to the competitive section of the Cannes Film Festival, after Dr. Lester James Peries’ maiden Rekava contest at Cannes in 1957.

References

External links

2005 films
2000s Sinhala-language films
2005 drama films
Films directed by Vimukthi Jayasundara
Films set in Sri Lanka (1948–present)
Caméra d'Or winners
Sri Lankan drama films